Makeup is a 2002 Indian Kannada-language comedy film directed by Singeetam Srinivasa Rao and starring Jaggesh in dual getups and Laila Patel. It was released on 3 October 2002.

To gather important information about a case, Jaggesh, a police officer, disguises himself as an old woman. During his investigation, he falls in love with a woman.

Cast 
Jaggesh as K.D. Roy and Doddamma
Laila Patel as Pooja
Bank Janardhan as a police commissioner
Mimicry Dayanand as Bobby
Tennis Krishna as Saridon
Komal as a Karate master
Pavitra Lokesh as Kamakshi
Shakti Kapoor
Yatiraj Jaggesh
Master Raghavendra
Jayaram

Production 
The make up for Jaggesh's grandmother getup in the film took four hours to apply. Newcomer Laila Patel from Mumbai was cast as the heroine. The film was produced by Jaggesh and his wife, Parimala, and was written by his son Gururaj. Shakti Kapoor and Jaggesh's son, Yathiraj, play supporting roles.

Soundtrack 
Debutante John composed the music.

Release 
A critic from Chitraloka gave a favourable review and opined that "Director Singeetham Srinivasarao has shown his diligence and proves that comedy is his hot favorite" and stated that "Jaggesh's effort and his dialogue delivery is a treat to watch". A critic from Viggy opined that "Jaggesh as Doddamma has done an excellent job" and called the film "A sheer pleasure for Jaggesh fans".

Box office 
Despite the positive reviews and a good run at the box office, the film was a box office failure and lost seventy five lakhs due to the film's high budget. Jaggesh had to sell his house to compensate for the loss. Jaggesh cites the reason for the film's failure is that the film released at the "wrong time". Despite the film's failure, Jaggesh garnered appreciation for his role.

References

External links 

2000s Kannada-language films
2002 comedy films
Films directed by Singeetam Srinivasa Rao
Indian comedy films